Richard Joseph Pearson (born May 2, 1938) is a Canadian archaeologist.

He grew up in Toronto and Oakville, Ontario, and graduated with a bachelor's degree at the University of Toronto in 1960. Richard Pearson studied at the University of Hawaii, and Yale University under K.C. Chang, and received his doctorate in anthropology in 1966. Over his career Pearson’s research interests have included the archaeology of Polynesia and East Asia.

Pearson attended the Summer Field School of the University of Western Ontario at Fort Penetanguishene and the Forget Site in Ontario in 1954 and participated in field survey and excavation with the Royal Ontario Museum (Serpent Mound), University of Toronto (Ault Park), National Museum of Canada (New Brunswick) the Bishop Museum (Hawaii and Tahiti) and Yale/National Taiwan University (Taiwan) from 1955 to 1965. His dissertation research concerned the Ryukyu Islands (1962–63). He started his career as a professor at the University of Hawaii, excavating at the Bellows Field Archeological Area and Lapakahi Complex in Hawaii. In the 1970s he continued field work in Okinawa. He returned to Canada in 1971 and spent most of his career as a professor in the Department of Anthropology and Sociology in the University of British Columbia in Vancouver, Canada. Pearson has written, edited, and/or translated a number of important books and journal articles on Japanese, Chinese, and Korean archaeology. Many of these publications depended on the collaboration of his wife, Kazue Miyazaki Pearson. His publications mostly concern East Asian prehistory with a focus on subsistence, trade and exchange, and social and economic organization. Part of his mission has been to make available in English the work of East Asian archaeologists and to show long term historical trends. Areas of research include the Jomon Culture of Japan, the Korean "Bronze Age", Chinese Neolithic cultures, the Ryukyu Islands, Taiwan, and the ancient cities of Osaka and Quanzhou. In 2015 he received a Book Accolade for Ground Breaking Matter from the International Conference of Asian Studies for his book Ancient Ryukyu (2013).

Selected bibliography 
 
 
 An Early Prehistoric Site at Bellows Beach, Waimanalo, Oahu, Hawaiian Islands (P.V. Kirch and M. Pietrusewsky, junior authors). Archaeology and Physical Anthropology in Oceania. VI:204-234, 1971.
 
 
  (Japanese version translated by T. Seki, Kodai, 76:1-16)
 (editor and translator, with Kazue Pearson) Kim, Jeong-hak, The Prehistory of Korea. University of Hawaii Press, Honolulu, 237 pp., 1978.
 
 
 
 (editor with junior editors K. Hutterer and G. Barnes) Windows on the Japanese Past. Ann Arbor, Center for Japanese Studies, 496 pp., 1986.
 (with junior authors J.W. Lee, W.Y. Koh, and A. Underhill) Social Ranking in the Kingdom of Old Silla, Korea: Analysis of Burials. Journal of Anthropological Archaeology 8(1):1-50, 1989.
 
 Ancient Japan. Washington and New York, A. Sackler Gallery, Agency for Cultural Affairs, Japan, George Braziller, 324 pp., 1992.
 
 (Li Min and Li Guo jr authors) Quanzhou Archaeology: A Brief Review. International Journal of Historical Archaeology 6:1:23-58, 2002.
 
 Jomon Hot Spot: Increasing Sedentism in Southwest Japan in the Incipient Jomon (14, 000 – 9, 250 cal BC) and Earliest Jomon (9, 250 – 5,300 cal BC) World Archaeology 38:2: 239-258, 2006.
 Early Mediaeval Trade on Japan’s Southern Frontier: Grey Stoneware of the East China Sea. International Journal of Historical Archaeology 11:2: 122-151, 2007.
 Debating Jomon Social Complexity. Asian Perspectives 46 (2): 361-388, 2007.
 (editor) Okinawa: The Rise of an Island Kingdom: Archaeological and Cultural Perspectives. BAR Series 1898. Oxford. Archaeopress, 2009.
 
 Ancient Ryukyu: An Archaeological Study of Island Communities. Honolulu University of Hawaii Press.2013
 Darwin and Island Archaeology, In "Darwin and Human Evolution" ed. R. Ray, D. Chattopadhyay, S.Banerjee, pp. 33–44. Kolkata, The Asiatic Society, 2014.
  (e-journal)
 Ōsaka Archaeology. Oxford. Archaeopress, 2016.
 editor, translator, contributor, with S Kaner, B. Ayers, O Wrenn. The Archaeology of Mediaeval Towns. Oxford, Oxbow Books. 2020.
(co-author Kazue Pearson), Miyazaki Ichisada to Aoki Mokubei, in INOUE Fuminori (ed) Soboku to Bunmei no Rekishigaku (Historiography of Naive and Civilized), pp. 410–424. Tokyo. Kodansha. 2021
Taiwan Archaeology: Local Development and Cultural Boundaries in the China Seas. Honolulu. University of Hawaii Press. 2023.

References 

1938 births
Living people
Asian archaeology
Archaeology of Korea
Archaeology of Japan
Academic staff of the University of British Columbia